King Arthur, subtitled "The Battle of Stonehenge, 536", is a board wargame published by Simulations Publications, Inc. (SPI) in 1979 that simulates the fictional Battle of Camlann between the forces of King Arthur and his son Mordred.

Gameplay
King Arthur is a game representing King Arthur's final battle, where he leads the Knights of the Round Table, other mounted knights, and archers against Mordred's coalition of rebel knights, Saxon men-at-arms, Scottish archers, Irish slingers, and Picts with poisoned arrows. The game uses the combat rules from SPI's previously published Great Medieval Battles.

Publication history
In 1979, SPI published the combat wargame Great Medieval Battles, a "quadrigame" (four separate battles using the same set of rules) that simulated King Arthur's final Battle of Camlann, Robert the Bruce at Bannockburn (1314), The Black Prince at the Battle of Navarette (1367), and Tamburlaine against the Ottoman Turks at the Battle of Angorra (1402).

Later the same year, SPI republished all four of the battles as separate stand-alone games, one of them being King Arthur: The Battle of Stonehenge, 536. The boxed set was designed by Rob and Linda Mosea, with artwork by  Redmond A. Simonsen.

Reception
Keith Gross reviewed King Arthur in The Space Gamer No. 29. Gross commented that "The game can be fairly playable if the man-to-man combat matrix is replaced with a simple die roll. Overall, King Arthur is not a bad game, but it's not a great one either."

Other reviews
Grenadier #15
Simulacrum #20
Wargame News #13

References

Board games introduced in 1979
Board wargames
Simulations Publications games